Ali Yousefpour is an Iranian journalist and conservative politician who was formerly a member of the Parliament of Iran from 1984 to 1996. In 2006, he was appointed as the caretaker for the Ministry of Welfare and Social Security under administration of Mahmoud Ahmadinejad.

Yousefpour is editor of Siyaset-e Rooz newspaper.

References

1955 births
Living people
Members of the 2nd Islamic Consultative Assembly
Members of the 3rd Islamic Consultative Assembly
Members of the 4th Islamic Consultative Assembly
Society of Devotees of the Islamic Revolution politicians
Islamic Society of Engineers politicians
Islamic Revolutionary Guard Corps personnel of the Iran–Iraq War
Association of Muslim Journalists politicians